Günter Herrmann (2 September 1934 – 7 November 2012) was a German footballer who played as a forward and was capped once for the Saarland national team.

References

External links
 Profile at DFB.de
 

1934 births
2012 deaths
Sportspeople from Saarbrücken
Footballers from Saarland
German footballers
Saar footballers
Saarland international footballers
Saarland B international footballers
Association football forwards
Sportfreunde 05 Saarbrücken players
SV Saar 05 Saarbrücken players
German football managers
SV Elversberg managers